Doris is a "comedy opera" in three acts by Alfred Cellier, with a libretto by B. C. Stephenson.  After the phenomenal success of Cellier and Stephenson's Dorothy (1886), the pair were hoping for another big hit.  Doris turned out to be only modestly successful.

It opened at the Lyric Theatre in London on 20 April 1889 and ran for 202 performances and was produced, like Dorothy, by Henry J. Leslie.  It starred Arthur Williams, Ben Davies, Alice Barnett, Hayden Coffin, Furneaux Cook and John Le Hay.  The title character was first played by opera and concert singer Annette Albu (1858–1927), a fine singer, but she was not a great comic actress and not considered pretty; after two months, with the show already flagging, Leslie replaced her with his star from Dorothy, Marie Tempest.

The New York Times review stated:
"Musically considered, the new comic opera is an English classic....  The composer does not descend at any time from his ideal plane.  There is [no] sacrifice of artistic form at any point to please the popular ear.  All the numbers are charming, and several of them... are simply gems....  The libretto... is about as ingeniously bad a bit of construction as could be conceived....  The comic opportunities are few and very conventional; consequently... the opera is neither funny nor interesting...."

Another critic concluded, "The libretto of Doris is so feeble that I misdoubt even Cellier's music, the splendid mounting of the piece, and the interesting Elizabethan processions pulling it through.  What judicious compression and unscrupulous 'gagging' may accomplish one cannot, of course, venture to prophesy. I understood that at the end of Dorothy's run very little if any of the original dialogue remained.  It had been improved out of recognition.  Still, both Dorothy and Falka rejoiced in plain straightforward stories everyone could understand.  The difficulty is to make head or tail of Doris."

Roles and original cast

Doris Shelton – Annette Albu/Marie Tempest
Lady Anne Jerningham – Amy Augarde
Mistress Shelton – Alice Barnett  
Dolly Spigott – Effie Chapuy  
Martin Bolder – Ben Davies  
Sir Philip Carey – C. Hayden Coffin  
Alderman Shelton – J. Furneaux Cook  
Crook  (Apprentice) – John Le Hay 
Dormer  (Apprentice) – W. T. Hemsley  
Barnaby Spigott – Percy Compton  
Dinniver – Arthur Williams

Synopsis
Act I
Sir Philip Carey is a fugitive, having been accused of participating in a plot against Queen Elizabeth I.  He loves Anne Jerningham, one of the Queen's maids of honor.  At a picnic given by her father, Alderman Shelton, Doris playfully runs away from Martin, her father's chief apprentice, and with whom she is in love.  Attempting to hide in a hollow tree, she finds Sir Philip, already concealed there.  She takes pity on him and convinces Martin and two friends to aid his escape.  Dinniver, a comical wicked servant, hides behind a bush, overhears the plan and tells the Alderman about it.  While the Alderman goes for the authorities, Dinniver is forced to exchange clothing with Philip, and so Dinniver is arrested in Philip's place.  Philip escapes.

Act II
Philip is posing as an apprentice to the Alderman, but he is betrayed by Martin.  After drawing the wrong conclusion from a letter, Martin has become jealous of Philip and Doris.  When Martin realises that his jealousy is unfounded, he remorsefully dons the fugitive's original clothes and is arrested in his place.  Sir Philip escapes again!

Act III
Both lovers appear at a masque given at the Alderman's house.  After a number of complications, the Queen pardons all political prisoners, including Philip, and all ends happily.

Musical numbers
Act I - Highgate Hill
No. 1 - Opening Chorus - "A Gold! A Gold!" 
No. 2 - Scena - Crook and Dormer - "My arrow's nearest to the centre, see?" 
No. 3 - Song - Shelton, Mrs. Shelton and Chorus - "I hereby do require..." 
No. 4 - Scena and Exit - "The cavalcade approaches..." 
No. 5 - Song - Doris - "Love's race" 
No. 6 - Duet - Doris and Sir Philip - "How hardly fate with some us us doth deal..." 
No. 7 - Song - Martin - "I've sought the brake and bracken..." 
No. 8 - Quartett - Doris, Dame Shelton, Martin and Philip - "Who are you, may I ask..." 
No. 9 - Quartett - Doris, Mrs. Shelton, Martin and Philip - "True Heart." 
No. 10 - Soli and Chorus - "Silently! Warily!" 
No. 11 - Finale - Act I - "Where is the traitor who threaten'd Her Majesty?"

Act II - Cheapside  
No. 12 - Introduction and The Alderman's Glee 
No. 13 - The Alderman's Song - Shelton - "What craven dares to talk of his home..." 
No. 14 - Soli and Chorus - "Go to bed." 
No. 15 - Song - Dinnever - "What has become of the door?" 
No. 16 - Song - Anne Jerningham - "Sir Philip's Farewell." 
No. 17 - Song - Sir Philip - "Honour bids me speed away..." 
No. 18 - Recitative and Duet - Anne and Sir Philip - "The Parting." 
No. 19 - Cavatina - Doris - "Learn to wait." 
No. 20 - Soli and Chorus - "What do you lack, Ladies?" 
No. 21 - Chorus of Beefeaters - "In many climes..." 
No. 22 - Finale - Act II - "Ye Citizens of London."

Act III - Interior of Alderman Shelton's House
No. 23 - Introduction and Chorus - "Who are you? What are you..." 
No. 24 - Duet - Doris and Martin - "If I am dreaming..." 
No. 25 - Quintett - Doris, Anne, Martin, Sir Philip and Shelton - "Fare thee well." 
No. 26 - Entrance of the Masquers and Chorus - "Far from eastern seas..." 
Nos. 27 and 28 - Recit. and Song - Doris and Martin - "I thank you for your gifts..." and "All the wealth..." 
No. 29 - Finale - Act III - "She will, she won't..."

Notes

External links
Listing of Cellier works
Midis, lyrics and cast list for Doris

English-language operas
English comic operas
1889 musicals
Operas
1889 operas
Operas by Alfred Cellier